Below are listed lists of sailors at the Summer Olympics.

 List of sailors at the Summer Olympics (alphabetically)
 List of 49er class sailors at the Summer Olympics
 List of Star class sailors at the Summer Olympics